Three Men to Kill (French: Trois hommes à abattre) is a French crime film released in 1980, directed by Jacques Deray, starring Alain Delon with Dalila Di Lazzaro. The screenplay is written by Jacques Deray, Alain Delon and Christopher Frank based on the novel Le Petit Bleu de la côte ouest by Jean-Patrick Manchette.

The story is about Michel Gerfaut (Delon), charming professional card player who out of nowhere becomes involved in some retribution between weapon traders of high level.

With 2,194,795 tickets sold, the film ranked 16th at the French box-office in 1980. Three Men to Kill is the first film of a group of popular films released in the 1980s and starring Alain Delon that share a visual and narrative style, followed by For a Cop's Hide (1981) and Le battant (1983).

Synopsis
Michel Gerfaut is a handsome middle-aged man who lives in Paris, France. He has a beautiful girlfriend called Béa and earns his living as a professional poker player. One night, as he is on his way to yet another card game, he comes across a car accident. Noticing that the driver of the crashed car is still alive, he brings him to the hospital. A newspaper article later reveals that the man, who was actually a high-ranking functionary, has died, and that two of his colleagues were killed the same night (the titular three men to kill). The men were assassinated as they were about to blow the whistle on a deal involving faulty guided missiles.

Gerfaut is followed by two hitmen who saw him at the crash site and mistakenly assumed that he is a mercenary hired by competing armament manufacturers to sabotage the deal. After several attempts on the lives of him and his girlfriend are made, Gerfaut flees and follows a series of clues that eventually lead him to the head of the conspiracy, an arms dealer named Emmerich. Emmerich doesn't believe Gerfaut's claims of innocence and becomes furious, causing himself a fatal heart attack. Emmerich's assistant then offers Gerfaut a job as his enforcer, but Gerfaut refuses and walks away, believing everything to be over.

The next day, Gerfaut and his girlfriend are seen having a walk in Paris where another pair of hitman ambushes and shoots Gerfaut.

Cast
Alain Delon as Michel Gerfaut
Dalila Di Lazzaro as Béa
Michel Auclair as Leprince
Pierre Dux as Emmerich
Pascale Roberts as Mrs Borel
Simone Renant as Mrs Gerfaut
Lyne Chardonnet as nurse
Jean-Pierre Darras as Chocard
Bernard Le Coq as Gassowitz
François Perrot as Etienne Germer
André Falcon as Jacques Mouzon
Féodor Atkine as Leblanc
Daniel Breton as Carlo
Christian Barbier as Liethard

Release and reception
The film was released in France on October 31, 1980. With 2,194,795 tickets sold, the film ranked 16th at the French box-office that year. It was Delon's most commercially successful film since Two Men in Town (1973).

The Japanese distributors reportedly cut the finale where Delon is assassinated and thus gave the film a happy ending. (Which somewhat more closely resembles the ending of the novel).

Pierre Murat wrote in Télérama: "This well-made and efficient thriller by Jacques Deray, where Delon does the perfect Delon and where music plays one of the main roles, definitely has more than one trump card up its sleeve."

References

External links
 

1980 films
1980s crime thriller films
Films directed by Jacques Deray
Films based on French novels
Films produced by Alain Delon
French crime films
French neo-noir films
Films scored by Claude Bolling
Films set in Paris
Films about assassinations
1980s French films